The Chinese Dream is a term closely associated with Xi Jinping, the General Secretary of the Chinese Communist Party (CCP) and China's paramount leader. Xi began promoting the phrase as a slogan during a high-profile tour of an exhibit at the National Museum of China in November 2012, shortly after he became leader of the CCP. The exhibit at that time was called the "Road to National Rejuvenation". Xi said that the Chinese Dream is the "great rejuvenation of the Chinese nation".

Since then, use of the phrase has become widespread in official announcements and as the embodiment of the leadership's political ideology under Xi Jinping. Xi said that young people should "dare to dream, work assiduously to fulfill the dreams and contribute to the revitalization of the nation." There are various connotations and interpretations of the term.

History

Chinese literature 
The phrase "Chinese Dream" corresponds with the associated idea of a hope for restoring earlier dynasties lost national greatness and has ancient origins in Chinese literary and intellectual history. In the Classic of Poetry (Shi Jing), the poem "Flowing Spring" describes a poet waking up in despair after dreaming of the former Western Zhou dynasty. During the troubled Southern Song dynasty, the poet Zheng Sixiao wrote a poem in which he coined the phrase "Heart full of [the] Chinese Dream (中国梦), the ancient poem 'Flowing Spring'", referring back to the classical poem. 

It should be noted, however, that the concept of "China" did not exist in the Southern Song Dynasty and is actually a 16th-century European invention. The word "中国" , literally "Middle" or 
"Central Kingdom", referred actually to the capital region (see ). Popular patriotic literary and theatrical works in early 20th century China also made reference to a "China Dream."

Western literature 
In 2008, architect Neville Mars, author Adrian Hornsby, and the Dynamic City Foundation published The Chinese Dream – a society under construction. The book investigates China's initial wave of rapid urbanization as it transitions to a socialist market economy. Maps of the emerging spatial forms and analysis of the economic development processes that have originated within the extreme conditions of the 1980s and 1990s are combined with progressive planning concepts and personal portraits of a rapidly changing society. As such, it synthesizes a body of research to tackle the main paradoxes at the heart of China's struggle for change and a more equitable and sustainable future.

According to Mars, "The present is so all-consuming that fast realities threaten to eclipse the slow dream of tomorrow." The overarching premise of the book is that China reveals a direct correlation between its shifting urban forms and its waning societal objectives. Written eight years ahead of the 12th FYP that holds the same thematic title "The Chinese Dream", it introduces the notion that China's highly fragmented, unchanging urban patterns determine a path of increasing inefficiency and energy-dependence. 

Mars introduces the term "MUD," or Market-driven Unintentional Development to describe this new hybrid urban condition, and suggests that planning itself needs to be radically redefined to be effective and not contribute to ex-urbanization. The conclusion of the book is "No New Cities", and a call for models of upgrading existing urban centers and suburbs.

In 2010, author Helen H. Wang published her first book The Chinese Dream. The book is based on over 100 interviews of the new members of the middle class in China. In the book, Wang did not define the Chinese Dream. Rather, she conveyed the hopes and dreams of the Chinese people through intimate portraits of this growing demographic.

The Chinese Dream was translated into Chinese (中国梦) and published in China in 2011. In 2012, the second edition of The Chinese Dream with a foreword by Lord Wei was published. In the foreword, Wei wrote:

The New York Times 

The British publication The Economist credits a column written by the American journalist Thomas Friedman for popularizing the term in China. A translation of Friedman's article, "China Needs Its Own Dream," published in The New York Times (October 2012) was widely popular in China. Friedman attributes the phrase to Peggy Liu, the founder of the environmentalist NGO JUCCCE. According to Isaac Stone Fish, former Asia editor for the magazine Foreign Policy, Friedman said, "I only deserve part credit... ensuing the concept of 'China Dream' was promoted by my friend Peggy Liu, as the motto for her NGO about how to introduce Chinese to the concept of sustainability."

James Fallows of The Atlantic has pointed out that the phrase has frequently been used in the past by journalists. He mentions Deborah Fallow's book Dreaming in Chinese, his own article "What Is the Chinese Dream?," and Gerald Lemos' book The End of the Chinese Dream as examples. In response to Fallows, The Economist cites an article in the Xinhua Daily Telegraph that directly credits Friedman.

The Economist writes that references to Friedman's article have also appeared in other Chinese media outlets, including a translation in The References News, in an article written for China's State Council Information Office, on the cover of the magazine Oriental Outlook as the main caption, in a magazine article published by Frontline, and in an article for a local newspaper written by China's ambassador to Romania, Huo Yuzhen. 

In the preface of the Oriental Outlook "Chinese Dream" issue, the editor states that "the 18th national congress of the Chinese Communist Party convened November 8th. "Does the next generation of Chinese leaders have a 'Chinese Dream' that is different from the "American Dream"?.... This was a question raised by one of America's most influential media figures, Thomas Friedman."

Xi Jinping 

Just after becoming General Secretary of the Chinese Communist Party in late 2012, Xi announced a political slogan that would become the hallmark of his administration. "The Chinese Dream," he said, is "the great rejuvenation of the Chinese nation." Formulated by Wang Huning, Xi's Chinese Dream is described as achieving the Two Centenaries: the material goal of China becoming a "moderately well-off society" by 2021, the 100th anniversary of the Chinese Communist Party, and the modernization goal of China becoming a fully developed nation by about 2049, the 100th anniversary of the founding of the People's Republic.

Xi's view is that "China is in the best development period since modern times and the world is in a state of the profound change on a scale unseen in a century." On this belief, Xi argues that "time and momentum are on China's side" citing: (1) the accelerating rise of emerging and developing countries, (2) the rate of new technologies replacing old ones, and (3) changing patterns of global governance.

In May 2013, Xi Jinping called upon young people "to dare to dream, work assiduously to fulfill the dreams and contribute to the revitalization of the nation." He called upon all levels of the Party and the government to facilitate favorable conditions for their career development.  Xi told young people to "cherish the glorious youth, strive with pioneer spirit and contribute their wisdom and energy to the realization of the Chinese dream."

According to an opinion piece by Robert Lawrence Kuhn, published by China's state-controlled newspaper China Daily, the Chinese Dream has four parts: "strong China", "civilized China", "harmonious China", and "beautiful China". Khun states, "the Chinese dream is described as achieving the 'Two 100s'", a concept promoted by Xi Jinping, adding, "The material goal of China becoming a 'moderately well-off society' by about 2020" and "The modernization goal of China becoming a fully developed nation by about 2050".

The Economist reported that Xi "had seen the American dream up close, having spent a couple of weeks in 1985 with a rural family in Iowa. (He revisited them during a trip to America last year as leader-in-waiting.)" Since the idea was put forward by Xi in November 2012 and repeated by him on numerous important occasions, the CCP's propaganda chief, Liu Yunshan, has directed that the concept of the Chinese Dream be incorporated into school textbooks.

In an article for the Huffington Post, French sinologist David Gosset presented the idea that the so-called "Liyuan Style" is an illustration of the China Dream. Gosset said that China's new First Lady Peng Liyuan is at the intersection of what he labeled "Modern China," "Civilizational China", and "Global China".

Interpretations 

The Chinese Dream is vaguely defined, and has led to multiple interpretations describing the phrase's meaning.

Compared to the American Dream
Author Helen H. Wang was one of the first to connect the Chinese Dream with the American Dream. In her book The Chinese Dream, Wang wrote: "The Chinese Dream, taking its title from the American Dream, alluding to an easily identifiable concept..." Wang attempts to demonstrate that the Chinese people have similar dreams as those of the American people. "This new [Chinese] middle class," Wang wrote, "which barely existed a decade ago, will reach the size of more than two Americas in a decade or two. They number in the hundreds of millions, with the same hopes and dreams that you and I have: to have a better life, to give our children an even better life...." Wang has also claimed that "Chinese people must define their own dream."

According to Shi Yuzhi, a professor at the National University of Singapore, the Chinese Dream is about Chinese prosperity, collective effort, socialism, and national glory. Shi compared the relationship between the phrase and the American Dream.

Academic Suisheng Zhao writes that the conceptualization of "[t]he Chinese Dream is thus distinguished from the American dream in that people can pursue individual dreams and contribute to the national dream at the same time."

Sustainable development 
The China Dream has been defined as sustainable development. Peggy Liu and the NGO JUCCCE coined the phrase "China Dream" as a movement based on sustainability, which was later popularized in China through a New York Times article and adopted by Xi Jinping. Pollution and food safety are popular concerns in China. Cities are frequently covered by smog and the country's rivers are polluted with industrial waste. China's rising middle class is expected to increase by 500 million people by 2025 and will continue to put a strain on the country's dwindling resources. 

According to Liu, the Chinese Dream of sustainability can be achieved through the promotion of green technologies and the reduction of widespread conspicuous consumption. China's high growth has caused widespread environmental damage, and without environmental reforms, the deterioration could threaten the legitimacy of the Communist Party. The Chinese Dream is a dream of a prosperous lifestyle reconciled with a sustainable lifestyle.

Ethnic nationalist revival 
The Chinese Dream has been viewed as a call for China's rising international influence. Xi Jinping refers to the dream as a form of national rejuvenation. Young Chinese are envious of America's cultural influence and hope that China could one day rival the US as a cultural exporter. Members of the Chinese military support China's military development, opining that the "strong-nation dream of a great revival of the Chinese people" can only result from a "strong-army dream." Former United States Secretary of State John Kerry has promoted the idea of a "Pacific Dream" to accommodate China's rise through regional collaboration over shared interests like the environment and economic growth.

The Chinese Dream is also a process to promote national rejuvenation through domestic ethnic policy. In 2012, when Xi Jinping first proposed the "Chinese Dream" during his visit to the "Road to Rejuvenation" exhibition, he suggested that "realizing the great rejuvenation of the Chinese nation is the greatest dream of the Chinese nation in modern times." In the next few years, Xi formulated new ethnic policies to achieve the rejuvenation of the Chinese nation. The goal of achieving national rejuvenation is to create an ethnically homogeneous "nation-state" and replace identities of ethnic minorities by a (Han) Chinese cultural identity. The Central Government aims to strengthen control over ethnic minorities through an assimilation project and to subject ethnic minorities to the exclusive rule of the Chinese Communist Party.

The phrase is used in local propaganda. In August 2014, local authorities in Cherchen County (Qiemo County) announced, "Incentive Measures Encouraging Uighur-Chinese Intermarriage," including a 10,000 CNY (US$1,450) cash reward per annum for the first five years to such intermarried couples as well as preferential treatment in employment and housing plus free education for the couples, their parents and offspring. County CCP Secretary Zhu Xin remarked:

Second-generation minzu policy in 2012 
The purpose of the second-generation ethnic policy is to cooperate with the ethnic assimilation project as part of the "national rejuvenation" to create a whole "Chinese nation-state." Some scholars suggest the first-generation of policy focuses on the recognition of 56 nationality (minzu) and on keeping the national unity while developing all groups. The second-generation ethnic policy was originally introduced in line with Xi Jinping's "national rejuvenation" theory of the Chinese dream. It was first proposed in 2011 by two Chinese scholars of National Conditions Institute of Tsinghua University, Hu Lianhe and Hu An’gang. 

Hu and Hu suggest that the proof of multiculturalism in the US, Brazil, and India adopting the model of the "ethnic melting pot" can prove the correctness of second-generation ethnic policies in China. Hu and Hu published their second paper of 2012 to deepen research on the relationship between national rejuvenation and the second-generation minzu policy. They suggest that the realization of the Chinese dream must rely on the integration of the peoples of China into a single nation-race (guo zu). 

Deepening the ethnic minorities’ adoption of the identity of the Chinese nation is the main thrust of the second-generation ethnic policy. The purpose is to cultivate a unified national identity under the Communist regime. Therefore, the second-generation ethnic policy is the enlightenment of the ethnic policy in Xi's era.

"Ethnic mingling" after 2014 
The new policy of "ethnic mingling"(jiao rong) proposed by Xi in 2014 is an assimilation policy based on "national integration" and "national unity." Xi attended the Second Xinjiang Work Forum, and stressed that,

The Forum's full set of document have not been made public. In his speech, Xi emphasized the term "national integration" many times. His goal is to establish a unified national identity between each ethnic group and to replace ethnic identities with the "Chinese race" (Zhonghua minzu). The substance of the "ethnic mingling" policy is a step in addition to the theory of the "melting pot" of the second-generation ethnic policy. For Xi's regime, the creation of the unified identity of the Chinese nation is a key factor in realizing the great rejuvenation of Chinese Dream; however, some scholars argue that the national revival campaign will make China lose cultural diversity and "indigeneity" (tuzhuxing).

Genocide since 2017 

Some scholars, journalists, and governments claim that the “ethnic mingling” policy implementation by the government evolved into cultural genocide since 2017. The period from 2017 to 2020 is the stage when the government took tough measures to implement the assimilation of ethnic minorities. These scholars claim that cultural genocide is a stage to deepen destruction of the group identity of ethnic minorities. Article 14 was the new regulations to lay the foundations to establish mass internment “re-education" system. The Chinese government promulgated new regulations on the grounds of “de-extremification of Muslims" in Article 14. 

According to these scholars, the Xinjiang internment camps aim to destroy Uyghurs’ religion and identity through a collective educational transformation. Since 2018, the government also encouraged intermarriage between Uyghurs and Han people to achieve "ethnic integration." A significant percentage of young Uyghur men are in the re-education camps and have been removed from Uyghur social life; a young Uyghur woman called Bahar stated that "this absence adds to the new social pressure to marry Han men." 

Since 2014, the trial implementation of intermarriage project established in some places of Xinjiang. The local government of Qiemo County in Xinjiang established a new regulation in 2014, called "Regarding the Incentive Measures for Families Encouraging Intermarriage Between Ethnic Minorities and Han." This policy is very generous with regard to ethnic-Han intermarriage families, with priority consideration and resolution in politics, housing, and children's employment, including a 10,000 yuan award each year for no more than five consecutive years and free tuition for their children from elementary school to high school, etc. James A. Millward, a scholar of Xinjiang at Georgetown University, stated that "state-sponsored efforts at ‘blending’ and ‘fusion’ will be seen by Uighurs in China or by China's critics anywhere as really aimed at assimilating Uighurs into Han culture.".

Chinese cultural nationalism under Xi Jinping’s leadership has promoted the forced assimilation of the Uyghur minority, which was condemned by international human rights groups such as Amnesty International, Human Rights Watch, and UN’s official website and its human rights experts. According to Adrian Zenz, the abuse of human rights in Xinjiang is occurring in the name of counter-terrorism with up to 1-1.5 million people in ‘rehabilitation camps’ who are subjected to political indoctrination, forced abortions, tortures, suppression of religious and cultural practices such as forcing the Uyghurs to eat pork and abandon Islamic prayers. Zenz claims that the conditions of the concentration camps are horrific, with the daily expenditure being less than 4.5 yuan (US$0.67) per person. The China Digital Times reported that the birth rate of Uyghurs has deceased and the incarceration rate in Xinjiang is 14 times higher than national average. Frequent deaths in custody have been reported in these camps due to the poor conditions. The practices of the Chinese government have been characterized as cultural genocide, ethnocide, or even genocide.

Individual dreams 
Some Chinese have interpreted the Chinese dream as the pursuit of individual dreams. Evan Osnos of The New Yorker comments that "Xi Jinping has sought to inspire his people by raising the flag of the China Dream, but they have interpreted it as China Dreams—plural." According to Osnos, the Chinese Dream is "the proliferation of 1.3 billion China Dreams." Sujian Guo and Baogang Guo argue, "To a great extent, the American dream has been exported to China and has become the Chinese dream." 

According to Shi Yuzhi, a professor at the National University of Singapore, the Chinese Dream is not about individual glory, but about collective effort. Measuring public sentiment on Sina Weibo, Christopher Marquis and Zoe Yang of CivilChina.org found that the Chinese Dream refers more to the common goods bestowed by civil society than it does to individual achievements. 

A main aim of the Chinese state propaganda is therefore the construction of links between individual and national aspirations, which also signifies the convergence of the values of the market economy and state nationalism. This is evident in Chinese entertainment television. In a genre of reality shows in public speaking, for example, contestants frequently connect between their "dreams" and the triumph of China and further emphasize the legitimacy of the Chinese Communist Party in delivering a better future.

Economic and political reform 
Some government officials and activists view the Chinese Dream as a need for economic and political reform. Sustaining China's economic growth requires economic reform encompassing urbanization, the reduction of government bureaucracy, and weakening the power of special interests. Chinese liberals have defined the Chinese Dream as a dream of constitutionalism. Southern Weekly, a liberal newspaper based in Guangzhou, attempted to publish an editorial titled "The Chinese dream: a dream of constitutionalism" which advocated the separation of powers, but was censored by the authorities. 

Both Xi Jinping and Premier Li Keqiang support economic reform, but have shied away from discussing political reform. Premier Li has said that "But however deep the water may be, we will wade into the water. This is because we have no alternative. Reform concerns the destiny of our country and the future of our nation." According to official CCP sources, the Chinese Dream is the "essence of Socialism with Chinese characteristics."

In October 2013, Britain's Chancellor of the Exchequer, George Osborne, described the Chinese Dream as a political reform that includes "rebalancing from investment to consumption."

Reactions 
In October 2015, Roderick MacFarquhar, a China expert at Harvard University, spoke at a conference on Marxism in Beijing. He said that Chinese leader Xi Jinping's talk of the so-called "Chinese Dream" was "not the intellectually coherent, robust and wide-ranging philosophy needed to stand up to Western ideas."

Ravi Kant, a financial writer, commented on Asia Times that Xi Jinping himself is hindering the Chinese people from realizing their dreams. He said that much of Xi's rise can be attributed to his belief in fajia, which emphasizes absolute power and authority of the ruler. He compared and contrasted Xi to Deng Xiaoping, who he said believed in empowering people instead of leaders, and whose policy contributed to China's economic rise. Kant said, "The only man standing between the Chinese people and the Chinese dream is Xi Jinping."

Derek Hird, a China expert at Lancaster University, said that Xi Jinping has built Confucian values, including conservative views of Chinese women's role in the family, into his Chinese Dream of nationalist revival. The Wall Street Journal reported that in the Xi era, new political slogans emphasizing "family, family education and family virtues" or "pass on the red gene" have come along with efforts to censor voices on women's rights.

According to some commentators, the "great rejuvenation of the Chinese nation", on which the Chinese Dream is based, is a mistranslation. A better translation of the phrase would be the "great rejuvenation of the Chinese race". Jamil Anderlini, an editor for the Financial Times, said that the concept of "Chinese race" nominally includes 56 officially recognized ethnicities (including Tibetans and Uyghurs) in China, but is "almost universally understood to mean the majority Han ethnic group, who make up more than 90 per cent of the population." He said that such race-based ideas are deeply connected to the history of the 20th century and earlier European colonialism.

See also
 Ideology of the Chinese Communist Party
 
 American Dream

References

Further reading
 Neville Mars, Adrian Hornsby and DCF, The Chinese Dream: A Society Under Construction (2008).
 Helen H. Wang, with a foreword by Lord Wei, The Chinese Dream: The Rise of the World's Largest Middle Class and What It Means to You (2010, 2012).
 Ping Liu, My Chinese Dream – From Red Guard to CEO (2012).
The Economist, "Chasing the Chinese dream", 4 May 2013.
 The Economist, "Chinese society: The new class war", special report, Saturday 9 July 2016, 16 pages.

Politics of China
Chinese culture
Environment of China
The New York Times
Ideology of the Chinese Communist Party
Xi Jinping Thought
2010s in China